Chris Chapman may refer to:
 Chris Chapman (rugby league), former rugby league footballer
 Chris Chapman (rugby league, born 1966), former rugby league footballer
 Chris Chapman (seismologist) (born 1945), British seismologist
 Chris Chapman (producer) (born 1981), television producer, director and writer
 Christine Chapman (born 1956), Welsh politician
 Christopher Chapman (1927–2015), Canadian filmmaker
 Chris Chapman (Real Tennis), Australian real tennis player